Jacobsen may refer to:

 Jacobsen (surname), including a list of people with the name
 Jacobsen Manufacturing, a former American manufacturer
 Jacobsen, a brand of lawn-care products by Textron
 Jacobsen Publishing, publisher of several American regional newspapers
 Jacobsen (beer), a brand of specialty beers owned by Carlsberg
 Miranda, California (formerly Jacobsen's), a place in Humboldt County, California, U.S.

See also

 Jacobson (disambiguation)
 Jakobsen, a surname
 Jakobson (surname)
 Theodor Jacobsen Observatory, University of Washington, U.S.
 H. N. Jacobsens Bókahandil, a bookshop in Tórshavn, Faroe Islands